El Barco is a village in Tucumán Province in Argentina.

References

Populated places in Tucumán Province